Thomas Bormolini (born 29 August 1991 in Sondalo) is an Italian biathlete. He competed in the 2014/15 world cup season, and represented Italy at the Biathlon World Championships 2015 in Kontiolahti.

Biathlon results
All results are sourced from the International Biathlon Union.

Olympic Games
0 medals

*The mixed relay was added as an event in 2014.

World Championships
9 medals

*During Olympic seasons competitions are only held for those events not included in the Olympic program.
**The mixed relay was added as an event in 2005.

References

External links

1991 births
Living people
Italian male biathletes
Biathletes at the 2018 Winter Olympics
Biathletes at the 2022 Winter Olympics
Olympic biathletes of Italy
Sportspeople from the Province of Sondrio